The Airco DH.11 Oxford (later de Havilland) was a British twin-engined biplane bomber which was designed to replace the  earlier Airco DH.10 Amiens. It was designed to use the unsuccessful ABC Dragonfly engine and was abandoned after the first prototype was built.

Development
The DH.11 Oxford was designed by Geoffrey de Havilland for the Aircraft Manufacturing Company as a twin-engined day bomber to replace the Airco DH.10 Amiens. It was designed (as required by the Specification) to use the ABC Dragonfly radial engine which promised to give excellent performance and had been ordered in large numbers to be the powerplant for most of the new types on order for the Royal Air Force. The DH.11 was a twin-engined biplane, with all-wood construction and three-bay wings. It had an aerodynamically clean, deep fuselage occupying the whole wing gap, giving a good field of fire for the gunners in the nose and mid-upper positions.

The first prototype flew in January 1919, powered by two  Dragonfly engines. The prototype encountered handling problems, and was handicapped by the Dragonfly engines, which were extremely unreliable, being prone to overheating and excessive vibration, while not delivering the expected power. Two further prototypes were cancelled in 1919, with no aircraft in the end being purchased to replace the DH.10.

Variants
 Oxford Mk I – Prototype – powered by two  ABC Dragonfly engines – one built.
 Oxford Mk II – Proposed version with two  Siddeley Puma engines – not built.
 DH.12 – Proposed version with Dragonfly engines and modified gunner's position – not built.

Specifications (Oxford Mk I)

See also

References

Citations

Bibliography

1910s British bomber aircraft
Oxford
Cancelled military aircraft projects of the United Kingdom
DH.011
Biplanes
Aircraft first flown in 1919
Twin piston-engined tractor aircraft